Arctotherium ("bear beast") is an extinct genus of the Pleistocene short-faced bears endemic to Central and South America. Arctotherium migrated from North America to South America during the Great American Interchange, following the formation of the Isthmus of Panama during the late Pliocene. The genus consists of one early giant form, A. angustidens, and several succeeding smaller species, which were within the size range of modern bears. Arctotherium was adapted to open and mixed habitat. They are genetically closer to the spectacled bear (Tremarctos ornatus), than to Arctodus of North America, implying the two extinct forms evolved large size in a convergent manner.

Evolution

Tremarctinae 
Arctotherium is part of the Tremarctinae subfamily of bears, otherwise known as the short faced bears, which also includes Arctodus (North American short faced bears) and Tremartcos (the Floridian and modern spectacled bear). Tremarctinae originate with their common ancestor, Plionarctos, in the Middle Hemphillian (earliest Late Miocene, ~10 Ma) of North America; Plionarctos is last recorded in the early Blancan (Early Pliocene, ~3.3 Ma). Around the Miocene-Pliocene boundary (~5 Ma) Tremarctines, along with other ursids, experienced an explosive radiation in diversity, as C4 vegetation (grasses) and open habitats dominated, the world experienced a major temperature drop and increased seasonality, and a faunal turnover which extinguished 60–70% of all Eurasian faunal genera, and 70–80% of North American genera. 

Correspondingly, recent genetic studies suggest that the mean divergence dates for Arctotherium, Arctodus and Tremarctos was 4.8 Ma, and between Arctotherium and Tremarctos at 4.1 Ma.  Interestingly, all three genera are first recorded from the Blancan (Late Pliocene) of North America, with the first possible record of Arctotherium sp. being a tooth found in the Cuscatlán Formation of El Salvador, dated to the latest Pliocene (2.588 Ma).

South America 
The oldest dated confirmed remains of Arctotherium in South America are those of the gigantic A. angustidens from Buenos Aires, Argentina. What the evolutionary history of Arctotherium was beforehand, particularly regarding its sudden significant size, is unclear. A. angustidens remains have been dated to between 1Ma to 0.7 Ma of the Pleistocene, which corresponds with the Ensenadan period (although the younger dates are uncertain).

A. angustidens went extinct at the start of the Lujanian (~700,000 years ago), replaced by medium-sized Arctotherium species. The first recorded successor species was A. vetustum (Middle Pleistocene), then shortly thereafter by the more robustly built A. bonariense (Middle / Late Pleistocene), along with A. tarijense (Middle Pleistocene to the Early Holocene). While the smallest but most widespread species, A. wingei, is only confirmed from the Late Pleistocene and Early Holocene, the species' more tropical disposition is thought to greatly limit fossilisation. That, along with A. wingei'''s more ancestral position in Arctotherium, suggests an origin in the Middle Pleistocene. 

Within Arctotherium, two clades are thought to exist- A. bonariense and A. tarijense have been described as the most derived species of the genus, whilst A. vetustum and A. wingei are regarded the most archaic, even more so than A. angustidens. Of these successor species, A. tarijense and A. wingei are by far the most successful when taking into account temporal & geographic range, and the frequency of fossil finds. A separate Andean form of Arctotherium is also suggested to have existed at the end of the Pleistocene, if those finds aren't representative of the currently Holocene-restricted T. ornatus.

Curiously, while Arctotherium's known species dramatically shrank in size after A. angustidens, Arctodus underwent the opposite transformation, transitioning from the medium-sized A. pristinus to the gigantic A. simus by the end of the Pleistocene.

 Cladogram 
Below is a cladogram exploring the relationships between species of Arctotherium.

Description

 Taxonomy Arctotherium was named by Hermann Burmeister in 1879. Tremarctinae (and therefore Arctotherium) appear to have a disproportionately shorter snouts compared with most modern bears, giving them the name "short-faced." This apparent shortness is an illusion caused by the deep snouts and short nasal bones of tremarctine bears compared with ursine bears; Arctotherium had a deeper but not a shorter face than most living bears. Although size can help differentiate the species, only cranial and dental identifiers can be used to differentiate between species. The upper canine is very similar between species of Arctotherium, differing mainly in size. The canine of A. wingei is the smallest among the species. The lower canine of A. wingei presents two enamel ridges as in A. angustidens and A. tarijense, while in A. vetustum and A. bonariense there are three ridges. In A. vetustum, the distal ridge is very small and the mesial ridge is small, while in A. angustidens and A. tarijense both ridges are large. 

With regard to locomotion, although the shape of the elbow joint suggests Arctodus sp., Arctotherium bonariense, and A. wingei the possibility of retaining semi-arboreal adaptations, the size of the elbow joint does not. As the medial epicondyle is particularly expanded in these species, it is likely that (as for the giant panda) the fossil Arctodus and Arctotherium retained this character in relation to their higher degree of forelimb dexterity. As these genera's convergent evolution towards large body size that could have been favoured by scavenging adaptations, then high degree of proximal dexterity could have been advantageous for these species and retained in the Tremarctinae lineage in spite of size evolution.

 Size Arctotherium species ranged between a variety of sizes, both between species and individuals of the same species. The sole remaining Tremarctine bear, the spectacled bear, exhibits strong sexual dimorphism, with adult males being 30%–50% larger than females. Phylogenetic bracketing, along with Arctotherium's ability to exploit a variety of resource rich/poor environments and niches, can help explain Arctotherium's morphological diversity.

Various attempts to calculate each species' body mass have been made; for example, a 2006 study calculated the mean weight of two species, A. bonariense at ~110 kg (hypothetical typical weight range = 106 kg-122 kg), and A. tarijense at ~139 kg (102 kg-189 kg).

According to a 2009 study, the weight ranges for Arctotherium were calculated as follows- A. wingei at 51 kg-150 kg, A. vetustum at 102 kg-300 kg, A. tarijense at 135 kg-400 kg, A. bonariense between 171 kg-500 kg, and A. angustidens at 412 kg-1,200 kg. The study considered each end figure as the maximum hypothetical weight. Further studies calculated an A. tarijense specimen's weight (MACN 971) at 231 kg, and A. wingei specimens from the Brazilian intertropical region at ~83 kg.

However, the authors consider the upper limit as improbable, and say that  is more likely. It would still make the species the largest bear ever found, and contender for the largest carnivorous land mammal known.

Distribution and habitat

Almost all Arctotherium species appear to be largely restricted to the Southern Cone, particularly Argentina, with the richest records being in the Buenos Aires Province. The exceptions are a possible record of A. vetustum in Brazil, a Blancan-age unassigned Arctotherium tooth from El Salvador, and A. wingei, which almost exclusively inhabited a more northern range. 

By the Late Pleistocene, A. tarijense held domain over the open and semi-arid Pampas and Patagonian habitats east of the Andes, inhabiting Argentina, Patagonian Chile, southern Bolivia, and Uruguay, although A. bonariense may have also been contemporary in Late Pleistocene Uruguay. A. tarijense has been described as having a very low density of fossil material in Patagonia.

On the other hand, A. wingei spanned across the northern, more mixed/forested and tropical parts of the continent, throughout the tropical savanna forests of Brazil to Bolivia, Venezuela, and into North America (Belize and the Yucatán Peninsula, Mexico). 

Paleobiology

 Late Pliocene & Early Pleistocene 
The oldest known specimen of Arctotherium consists of a baby tooth (dp4 molar) found in the Río Tomayate locality of Cuscatlán Formation of El Salvador, along with a partial Borophagus skull, dated to the latest Pliocene (2.588 Ma). The archaic form and size of the tooth is closest to A. angustidens, however as only one other baby tooth has been recovered from Arctotherium (A. tarijense), the tooth was only confidently assigned at the genus level as Arctotherium sp.Arctotherium only reappears in the fossil record 1 million years ago as A. angustidens, from the Buenos Aires province of Argentina. A. angustidens is the only known species of Arctotherium from the Early Pleistocene.

The first recorded Arctotherium specimens in South America occur alongside the earliest known South American records of several other carnivorans: the sabre-toothed cats Smilodon and Homotherium, the puma (Puma concolor), the jaguar (Panthera onca), some large 25 kg–35 kg canids, and several smaller (<15 kg) mustelids, canids, felids and mephitids. 

The North American carnivorans that invaded South America, including short-faced bears and Smilodon, probably quickly adopted the predatory niches formerly occupied by the native typical South American groups such as metatherian sparassodonts and phorusracids that had largely gone extinct shortly prior to their arrival. 

 A. angustidens 
In the Ensenadan, A. angustidens was only rivalled in size by Smilodon populator, with Theriodictis platensis, Canis gezi, Protocyon scagliorum, Panthera onca and pumas rounding out the predator guild in the Early Pleistocene Argentina. The extinction of the scavenger-niche specialist procyonid Chapalmalania during this faunal turnover event is hypothesized as being the gateway for A. angustidens' gigantism. Using carbon isotopes, A. angustidens' diet has been posited to be omnivorous with a preference towards large quantities of meat. Beyond the scavenging of mega-herbivore carcasses, the type of tooth wear present amongst A. angustidens specimens, in addition to the frequency of broken teeth from most specimens (especially at older ages), suggests the active predation of large vertebrates, including but not limited to horses, tapirs, camelids, macraucheniids, glyptodonts, giant ground sloths, toxodontids, and gomphotheres by A. angustidens. Of the dentition known from later Arctotherium species, only one specimen of A. bonariense exhibits the same cracked teeth which A. angustidens had, although extreme wear of the occlusal molar surface is common throughout the genus. Moreover, pathologies found on a huge specimen of A. angustidens, being multiple deep injuries which had long healed despite infection, demonstrate a lifestyle of conflict.

Three A. angustidens individuals were discovered in a paleoburrow together (postulated to have been a mother with adolescent cubs), which opens the possibility that A. angustidens lived in family groups. A. tarijense and A. wingei are also hypothesized to have utilised dens. In contrast with the spectacled bear's tropical and temperate habitat, Pleistocene Argentina's seasonal and often harsh climate suggests quasi-hibernation would have been an effective strategy for survival, as ursine bears do today. A. angustidens is thought to have reoccupied caves excavated by Xenarthra, such as the mylodonts Glossotherium and Scelidotherium, and the pampatheriid Pampatherium. As suitable paleoburrows are rare before the Great American Interchange, it has been suggested that predation and competition for dens by the newly arrived eutherian carnivores, especially by A. angustidens, increased the rate of xenarthran cave excavations.

 Middle Pleistocene onwards 

It has been suggested that as a diverse carnivore guild became established in South America, the Arctotherium genus began to revert to more classic ursid diets as the ecosystem matured in the Middle Pleistocene. After A. angustidens became extinct, two forms begin to appear in the fossil record. The A. bonariense / A. tarijense species complex was composed of adaptable, cosmopolitan omnivores, whereas A. vetustum & A. wingei were largely herbivorous. However, as A. vetustum and A. wingei are the most archaic species of Arctotherium, their lineage must have existed before the emergence of A. angustidens in the Enseadan period of the Early Pleistocene.

Additionally, the diet of A. wingei was not necessarily orthodox, with carnivory likely peaking in times of resource instability. For example, several bite marks on recovered fossils of herbivores, such as Glossotherium and Equus, are suggested to have been inflicted by scavenging short-faced bears across Lujanian South America.

 A. bonariense & A. tarijense A. bonariense and A. tarijense had a typical prey weight of 100 kg, with a maximum of 300 kg. A. tarijense competed against Smilodon populator, giant jaguars (Panthera onca mesembrina), pumas, Lycalopex, Cerdocyon, Conepatus, Didelphis, and Dusicyon avus in Late Pleistocene Argentina, occasionally hunting camelids and horses as a supplement to scavenging, smaller prey and herbivory. Although carnivory increased the further south Arctotherium lived, carbon isotopes suggest that A. tarijense's prey weight limit peaked at 300 kg, leaving the (subadult and younger) mega-mammals, such as the gomphotheres, giant ground sloths, and toxodontids, to Smilodon populator and giant jaguars. Smilodon fatalis, Arctotherium bonariense, Canis nehringi, maned wolves, and humans would have also joined this predator guild at various stages of the Lujanian. However, a fragmented Arctotherium c.f. tarijense tooth from Baño Nuevo-1 cave in southern Chile preserves cavities, which could be interpreted as a consequence of consuming carbohydrate-rich foods such as fruit or honey. A further microwear analysis attempt of the tooth in 2015 was complicated by hard plant and bone consumption causing similar damage to teeth in omnivores.

 A. vetustum & A. wingei 
Along with clues from various teeth of A. wingei, carbon isotope studies suggest that A. wingei, at least in the Brazilian intertropical region, were highly herbivorous, specialising in C3 vegetative matter such as fruits and leaves. This is not to diminish potential carnivory in A. wingei, as the same study pointed to isotope spikes indicating the consumption of the ground sloth Nothrotherium maquinense (hypothesized as a preference for younger individuals and opportunistic scavenging), and A. wingei itself, which could represent cannibalism for juveniles or cubs, as observed in American black bears and polar bears.  According to a 2021 study, the maximum prey for A. wingei would be around its own bodyweight (~83 kg).

In the low-density savanna forests of the Brazilian intertropical region, A. wingei, pumas and jaguars played a supporting role to the (also likely solitary) Smilodon populator's dominance of the regional predator guild, avoiding competition with Protocyon troglodytes in more open savanna. Being smaller and more herbivorous, A. wingei would have also likely competed with other smaller carnivorans present in the BIR, such as jaguarundi, Lycalopex, Chrysocyon, Cerdocyon, Theriodictis, Speothos, Nasua, Procyon, Eira, Conepatus, Galictis, and Leopardus. Additionally, as dire wolves (Aenocyon dirus) and Smilodon fatalis inhabited north-western South America, and were joined by American lions, grey wolves and coyotes in Central America, A. wingei would have been a member of various predator guilds across the species' range. A. wingei's association with Protocyon in the terminal Pleistocene of the Yucatán, another animal previously thought to be endemic to South America, suggests a complex relationship of faunal interchange long after the Great American Interchange.

 Paleo-ecological reconstructions 
Although mostly herbivorous, the modern spectacled bear is on occasion an active predator. The spectacled bear has several hunting techniques- principally, the bear surprises or overpowers its prey, mounts its back, and consumes the immobilised animal while still alive, pinning the prey with its weight, large paws and long claws. Alternatively, the bear pursues the prey into rough terrain, hillsides, or precipices, provoking its fall and/or death. After death, the prey is dragged to a safe place (usually a nest over a tree, or a forested area) and consumed, leaving only skeletal remains. These behaviours have been suggested as Arctotherium's hunting strategies as well. However, although the spectacled bear is capable of climbing trees, Arctotherium is thought to be non-arboreal.

Extinction
The last known records of Arctotherium are an ambiguous find of A. bonariense from Uruguay (cf./aff, either ~36,900 or ~14,485 BP of the Sopas Formation, A. tarijense at 10,345 BP in the Cueva Del Puma, Patagonia, Chile, and A. wingei at 12,850 BP in the Sistema Sac Actun (Yucatán), Mexico, with a possible record of 9,000 BP in Muaco, Venezuela. Interestingly, the remains of A. wingei in the Hoyo Negro of the Yucatán appear to be in association with human remains.Tremarctos does not appear in the South American fossil record until the Holocene, suggesting that the extant spectacled bear descends from an independent, later dispersal event from North America to that of Arctotherium, possibly after A. wingei became extinct in the Americas. The modern spectacled bear may have hybridised with Arctotherium as they migrated southwards into South America. Globally, in the Quaternary Extinction Event, extinction favoured 'conservative morphologies' in ursid body plans, such as those found in the T. ornatus''.

References

Pleistocene bears
Pleistocene carnivorans
Prehistoric carnivoran genera
Pleistocene mammals of North America
Blancan
Pleistocene El Salvador
Fossils of El Salvador
Pleistocene mammals of South America
Uquian
Ensenadan
Lujanian
Pleistocene Argentina
Pleistocene Bolivia
Pleistocene Brazil
Pleistocene Chile
Pleistocene Venezuela
Fossils of Argentina
Fossils of Bolivia
Fossils of Brazil
Fossils of Chile
Fossils of Venezuela
Fossil taxa described in 1857